is a Japanese racing driver. He has competed in such series as Super GT and the All-Japan Formula Three Championship.

Racing career 
Takuto Iguchi began his motorsports career in 2000 with kart racing in his hometown of Fukuoka. Iguchi raced karts in various Japanese series, winning the FA class of the All Japan Kart Championship in 2005.

in 2006 and 2007 Iguchi raced in the Formula Toyota and Formula Challenge Japan series.

Iguchi moved to All Japan Formula Three in 2008, racing for TOM'S. He finished sixth place in the 2009 Macau Grand Prix, The highest place finish of any Japanese driver that year. Iguchi raced one season of Formula Nippon in 2010 for Deliziefollie/Cerumo-Inging finishing thirteenth in the drivers' championship.

Takuto Iguchi began racing in Super GT in 2008. He currently drives for R&D Sport in a Subaru BRZ

Nurburgring 24 hours 
Iguchi first took competed in the 24 Hours Nurburgring in 2012 taking the SP3 class victory with Gazoo Racing in a Toyota 86. Takuto Iguchi raced in the 2014 and 2015 24 Hours Nurburgring also for Gazoo, racing a Lexus LFA CodeX in both races and won the SP-PRO class victory both years.

Racing record

Complete Super GT results

‡ Half points awarded as less than 75% of race distance was completed.
* Season still in progress.

References

External links
 Official website
 Career statistics from Driver Database

1988 births
Living people
Sportspeople from Fukuoka Prefecture
Japanese racing drivers
Japanese Formula 3 Championship drivers
Super GT drivers
Formula Nippon drivers
Formula Challenge Japan drivers
TOM'S drivers
Toyota Gazoo Racing drivers
Nürburgring 24 Hours drivers